Practices of body ornamentation are a cultural universal (found in all human societies).
They can involve
body modification (permanent)
tattoos
branding
body piercing
body art (non-permanent)
body painting, makeup
hairstyles
hair coloring
accessories
jewelry
clothing

See also
Human physical appearance